The Mercedes-Benz 300 SL (chassis code W 198) is a two-seat sports car which was produced by Mercedes-Benz as a gullwinged coupe (1954–1957) and roadster (1957–1963). It was based on the company's 1952 racer, the W194, with mechanical direct fuel injection which boosted power almost 50 percent in its three-liter overhead camshaft straight-six engine.

Max Hoffman, Mercedes-Benz's United States importer at the time, inspired the 300 SL and saw an American market for such a car. The company introduced the 300 SL in February 1954 at the International Motor Sports Show in New York City (instead of Europe) to get it into US buyers' hands sooner.

SL is the short form for "super-light" in German (super-leicht)Mercedes' first use of the designation, referring to the car's racing-bred light tubular-frame construction. The 300 SL was voted the "sports car of the century" in 1999.

Development

Origin in the W194 racing car

The 300 SL traces its origin to a racing sports car, the Mercedes-Benz W194. For this purpose, Daimler-Benz decided to race in 1951 and built a sports car. As a result, Mercedes' largest engine was developed: the M186, shared by the 300 "Adenauer" saloon (W186) and the luxury 300 S two-seat tourer (W188).

Racing successes in 1952 were somewhat surprising as the W194 engine was fitted only with carburetors, producing less than competing cars by Ferrari and Jaguar and the 300 SL road car introduced in 1954. Nevertheless, low weight and low aerodynamic drag made the W194 fast enough to be competitive in endurance races.

Mercedes-Benz developed a new version for the 1953 racing season by adding fuel injection and 16-inch wheels; the gearbox was installed on its rear axle. Mercedes-Benz decided not to race this alloy car, choosing instead to begin participating in Formula One in 1954. Later versions revised the body to lower air resistance, and did not continue the transmission arrangement.

Origin of the 300 SL

Mass production of the 300 SL was not initially planned. However, the idea of a toned-down Grand Prix car for affluent performance enthusiasts in the booming post-war American market was suggested by Max Hoffman at a 1953 directors' meeting in Stuttgart. Mercedes' new general director, Fritz Konecke, agreed to Hoffman's order for 1,000 cars; the 300 SL was introduced at the February 1954 New York International Auto Show instead of the Frankfurt or Geneva shows, where company models usually debuted. In addition, the production of a smaller roadster, the Mercedes-Benz 190 SL, was announced after Hoffman ordered another 1,000 of the roadsters. The 300 SL and the 190 SL premiered at the 1954 New York show; Mercedes-Benz experienced a positive visitor response to both, and production began at the Sindelfingen plant in August of that year.

Cost
The price for the 300 SL coupe in Germany was DM 29,000, and $6,820 in the US. The roadster was DM 32,500 in Germany, and $10,950 in the US – 10 percent more expensive than the coupe in Europe, and over 70 percent more in the US.

SL abbreviation
Mercedes-Benz did not announce what the abbreviation "SL" meant when the car was introduced; magazines and company officials have called it "Sport Leicht" and "Super Leicht" ("light"). It was called "Sport Leicht" on the company website until 2017, when "SL" was changed to "Super Leicht" after a chance finding in the corporate archives.

300 SLS

A special 300 SLS (Super Light Special) version of the 300 SL roadster was created for the Mercedes-Benz US racing team to compete on the Sports Car Club of America (SCCA) national circuit in 1957. After the 300 SL coupe dominated the D Production class en route to titles in 1955 and 1956, the rules were changed to make the class more competitive by enlarging the maximum engine size from three to 3.5 liters. Rather than radically modifying its engine size (on the cusp of releasing the company's new 300 SL roadster, replacing the coupe), Mercedes-Benz created two roadsters to campaign on the D Modified class SCAA circuit. They featured a solid cover over the passenger seat, a low-profile racing screen in place of a full-width and -height windscreen, a driver's seat roll bar, a custom cowl with engine air intake, and no front and rear bumpers. Team driver Paul O'Shea again won the title for the company.

Overview

The 300 SL has a tubular frame on a steel chassis, with a steel body attached to the frame. To reduce weight, its bonnet, doors, dashboard, and boot lid are aluminum. An additional  could be eliminated with an expensive all-aluminum body, but only 29 were made.  Depending on the rear axle ratio, fuel consumption was 17 liters per 100 km (14 miles per US gallon; 17 miles per imperial gallon).

Interior
Three checkered-pattern seat fabrics were standard: grey and green, grey and blue, and cream and red. Most customers opted for leather upholstery, which became standard on the roadster. With upward-opening doors, the coupe has an unusually-high sill; entering and exiting the car is problematic. The steering wheel pivots on its hub 90 degrees away from the dashboard to facilitate entry. Storage space for luggage is behind the seats in the coupe; the boot only holds a spare wheel and fuel tank. The roadster was available with two custom-fitted leather suitcases for the larger boot. The coupe's windows are fixed and roll down in the roadster.

Exterior
The body consists mainly of sheet steel, with the bonnet, boot lid, dashboard, sill, and door skins made of aluminum. Silver-grey was the standard color; all others were options.

The objective of the overall design was to make the vehicle as streamlined as possible. The width of the tubular frame along the cockpit allowed the cabin roofline to be inset considerably on both sides, dramatically reducing the front area. The structure was also quite high along the midline, prohibiting the attachment of standard doors. The only option – already used on the W194 race car – which would allow passengers over its high, deep sill was a gullwing door.

Eyebrows are a stylistic feature. The front pair deflect road water from the windscreen, and the rear were added for visual symmetry. The eyebrows added style to an otherwise slab-sided body. According to Mercedes-Benz, they were aerodynamic additions that pushed air over the top of the car and kept the windows clean in bad weather.

Engine
The Mercedes-Benz M198 engine is a water-cooled  overhead cam straight six. Like the racing Mercedes-Benz M194, the 300 SL borrowed the basic two-valves-per-cylinder M186 engine from the regular four-door 300 (W186 "Adenauer") luxury touring car introduced in 1951.

It featured the M186's aluminum head: a 30-degree diagonal base, allowing larger intake and exhaust valves than a standard horizontal joint with the engine block. To improve performance, the M198 replaced the W194's triple two-barrel Solex carburetors with a Bosch mechanical fuel-injection system. This raised output on the 300 SL from  SAE gross to  SAE gross at 6,100 rpm. Compression was set at 8.55:1.

Another performance feature was dry sump lubrication, which ensured proper oil distribution in high-speed cornering and reduced engine height by eliminating a traditional oil pan. A more-powerful version of the M198, with a radical sports camshaft and 9.5:1 compression ratio, could be ordered free of additional charge for the coupe. The roadster had this engine only in its 1957 debut year. For the M198 engine to be installed in a low-profile car, it was tilted 50 degrees toward the driver's side. The result was aerodynamic efficiency and an enormous, sand-cast aluminum intake manifold as wide as the engine.

The engine was coupled by a single-disc dry clutch to a four-speed transmission with gear ratios of 3.34:1, 1.97:1, 1.39:1, and 1:1, and a reverse ratio of 2.73:1. The stock rear-axle ratio at the beginning of production was 1:3.42; at the 41st vehicle, it was changed to 1:3.64 for better acceleration. Faster acceleration was provided with ratios of 1:3.89 and 1:4.11. City drivers found the tall first gear challenging. Clutch-pedal operation was initially cumbersome, remedied by an improved clutch-arm helper spring.

Unlike present-day electronic fuel-injection systems, the 300 SL's mechanical fuel pump would continue to inject gasoline into the engine during the interval between ignition shut-off and the engine's coming to a stop. This extra fuel washed away the oil film critical to an engine during start-up and led to oil dilution, excessive ring wear, and scouring of the cylinder walls. Exacerbating the problem was the engine's dry-sump lubrication system, with its large oil cooler and enormous  oil capacity, which virtually guaranteed that the oil would not get hot enough on the short trips frequently taken by most car owners to flow properly. Owners might block off airflow through the oil cooler and stick rigidly to the appropriately low  recommended oil-change interval. An auxiliary fuel pump provided additional fuel for extended high-speed operation (or cold starts), but overuse could also lead to oil dilution. From March 1963 to the end of production later that year, a light alloy crankcase was installed in 209 vehicles.

Chassis

Like modern racing cars, the 300 SL has a tubular frame designed by Mercedes head engineer Rudolf Uhlenhaut. A tubular frame provided high stability with low vehicle mass. Thin, straight chrome-molybdenum tubes were assembled as triangles, with the finished frame weighing . The tubes make a deep side panel, requiring gullwing doors. The coupe frame has two side rails, and the top tube is level with the driver's elbow. The center of gravity is almost exactly in the middle of the vehicle.

The chassis was a regular Mercedes-Benz W186 with a sportier tuning. Unlike many 1950s cars, recirculating ball steering was relatively precise, and the four-wheel independent suspension allowed for a reasonably-comfortable ride and markedly-better overall handling. The front suspension consisted of double wishbones, coil springs, and a stabilizing bar. The rear swing axle, jointed only at the differential (not at the wheels themselves), could be treacherous at high speeds or on bad roads due to extreme changes in camber. The coupe has a high-pivot swing axle, radius arms, and coil springs; the high-pivot swing axle was replaced with a low-pivot swing axle in the roadster.

Wheels

The front wheels are hung on double, unequal-length wishbones with coil springs and hydraulic telescopic shock absorbers; a torsion-bar stabilizer was installed. The coupe's rear axle was a two-joint design, with one joint on each side of the differential at its centreline.

The roadster's wheels were larger than the coupe's. The wheels were steel bowl/aluminum rim rivet compound wheels. Rudge 5J × 15-inch rims were a valuable option. The tires were 6.50-15 inches on the coupe and 6.70–15 on the roadster.

The 300SL had the same  self-cooled, turbo drum brakes as the Mercedes 300S. A brake booster was used to decrease pedal force by using negative pressure from the intake manifold. The front drum brakes were two-wheel brake cylinders/wheels, and the rear drum brakes were one-wheel brake cylinders/wheels. The handbrake was a mechanical parking brake that acted on the rear wheels. The roadster had the same drum brakes until March 1961, when Ø  front and rear disc brakes were introduced.

Roadster

In mid-1956, sales had begun to fall, and the board decided to show a convertible version at the Geneva show in March and convert the factory to a roadster version in May 1957 to serve the California market.

The 300 SL Roadster, with conventional doors, was first exhibited at the Geneva Salon in May 1957. The production of an open 300 SL involved redesigning the cockpit with lower sills for improved access. The rear suspension also incorporated low-pivot swing axles.

Its tubular frame was modified to create more space in the boot. The spare tire was placed under the boot floor and, combined with a smaller fuel tank, made room for custom-made fitted luggage. The lower door sill provides a more comfortable entry.

This improved handling (particularly in corners) and comfort. Head engineer Uhlenhaut wanted the new low pivot axle for the coupe but was voted down by the board of directors, which reminded him that 3,000 manufactured axle units remained at the factory and costs were already high for the car. An optional hardtop became available in September 1958.

Racing

Mercedes decided to return to international motorsport at the beginning of the 1950s, and Alfred Neubauer was again entrusted with the task. In 1951, the company built five V8 W165 cars and engines to enter the Grand Prix. Ferrari's V16 performed well at Silverstone, however, and Neubauer knew that the W165 could not win; Mercedes began planning a V12 W195. The FIA sporting commission changed the rules for 1954 in October 1951, and the W195s could not compete; the company began to develop a six-cylinder 300 SL for racing. Its doors originally extended onto the bottom of the side windows, and access through them required a removable steering wheel.

1952 

The 300 SL's first race was the 1952 Mille Miglia. The  race was from Brescia to Rome and back, pitting Karl Kling's 300 SL against Giovanni Bracco's new 3-liter V-12 Ferrari. Bracco won by four minutes and 32 seconds, and Kling finished second. Driving a car with a less-powerful engine, Rudolf Caracciola placed fourth.

Two weeks after the Mille Miglia, the original four cars raced at Bern before the Grand Prix. Concerned that Le Mans officials would not accept the gullwing-door design, Daimler-Benz revised the door down into the side of the body. Rear-brake locking was a continuing problem for the 300 SL; Caracciola's coupe hit a tree head-on, and he did not race again. Kling, Hermann Lang and Fritz Riess finished first, second and third when the 4.1-liter Ferrari broke down at the start.

Three new cars were built for the 24 Hours of Le Mans race in June. The engines were detuned for the long race to 166 bhp, and the fuel-tank filler rose above the rear window. The team brought an experimental spare car with a rooftop air brake which folded flat until the driver activated it. The unusual brake design unnerved the other drivers. The brake was effective; at 100 mph it could exert a deceleration of up to 0.2 g, but it also weakened the supporting pylons. The cars used more tires than expected, and Kling and Hans Klenk were forced out of the race by a generator failure.

The  Nürburgring race on August 2 was held on a challenging track. The competition shifted to Jaguar and Alfa Romeo. Nürburgring required a light, powerful car; aerodynamics were less critical, so the top of the coupe was removed (creating a 300 SL roadster with the rear deck and the passenger's side covered by an aluminum cover). All four cars raced at Nürburgring in unsupercharged form after trials indicated no benefit with a supercharged engine, which was no faster than the standard 300 SL. The team concluded that the car's relatively-crude swing-axle rear suspension was already at its limit in transmitting power to the road, and the engine was less durable. Lang won the race, with Kling and Riess finishing second and third. This was the official end of the company's efforts with the 300 SL, it felt that it had done all it could with the six-cylinder racers and would focus on the Grand Prix.

For a final outing, the company (pressured by the Daimler-Benz representative in Mexico City) sent Mexico two -ton trucks and 35 people to compete in the third Carrera Panamericana. Two 300 SL coupes and two roadsters were updated with right-side exhaust and new window molding. Since there was no three-liter class, the cylinder displacement was increased to 3.1 liters to provide 177 bhp. Continental did not have the time (or expertise) to make special tires for the event, so the company sent 300 tires of different types. The 300 SLs did better later, overtaking the lead Ferrari driven by Bracco. Kling and Klenk finished first, ahead of Lang and Erwin Grupp. A 1-2-3 finish might have been the final result, but American John Fitch was disqualified for allowing a mechanic to touch his car on the next-to-last day.

The race team prepared a new version of the 300 SL for the 1953 season; the 300 SLK would be lighter, with a shorter wheelbase, larger wheels, fuel injection, and better brakes. After Mercedes prioritized its efforts on a new Grand Prix car, however, the 300 SLK was canceled.

Mid-1950s 
Werner Engel won the 1955 European Rally Championship in a 300 SL. Stirling Moss won the overall title at the 1955 Mille Miglia in a 300 SLR racing car, and John Fitch won his class in a production 300 SL coupe. The marathon Liege-Rome-Liege rally was won in 1955 by Olivier Gendebien, and in 1956 by Willy Mairesse. A 300 SL won the Sports Car Club of America Class D championship from 1955 to 1957.

Racing roadster

Although roadsters were made for touring, Daimler-Benz marketed its roadster by racing on American tracks. Since production began, the Sports Car Club of America could not admit the roadster as a standard model for the 1957 season; it would have to compete in the Class D sports-racing car class with other three-liter cars such as the Maserati 300S, Ferrari Monza, and Aston Martin DB3S. The O'Shea-Tilp team used a lightened roadster with drilled front coil-spring mounts, no fan, a welded sheet-aluminum inlet manifold, and twin exhaust-pipe outlets. The roadster (sometimes known as the SLS) won the 1957 Class D Sports championship with triple the points of its nearest competitor, Carroll Shelby's Maserati.

1957present 
Horácio Macedo finished second in the 1960 Rali Vinho da Madeira.

Reception and sales
Sales quintupled in the model's second year but dropped off over the next three years. Roadster sales were initially high before leveling off to about 200 a year. Initially, the model was distributed mainly by Max Hoffman and later on by the Studebaker-Packard Corporation.

Production numbers

Notable owners 
Mohammad Reza Pahlavi, Wernher von Braun, Rob Walker, Juan Manuel Fangio, Juan Peron, B. J. Habibie, Tony Curtis, Pablo Picasso, Sophia Loren, Romy Schneider, Clark Gable, Glenn Ford, Briggs Cunningham, Luigi Chinetti, John von Neumann, Pierre Trudeau, Justin Trudeau, Paul Newman, Yul Brynner, Bernie Ecclestone, Ralph Lauren, Frank Lloyd Wright, Adrian Conan Doyle, King Abdullah II of Jordan and Natalie Wood have owned a 300 SL.

Legacy

A less-expensive, 1.9-liter roadster was introduced in 1955 as the 190 SL, followed by the 230 SL. Subsequent SL generations include the W113 (1963–1971) and the R129 (1989–2001). The SL has since evolved into a more autobahn-focused grand tourer due to its increased weight, especially with the later optional V12 engine. The last two generations of the SL are coupe convertibles.

The ,  V8 Mercedes-Benz SLS AMG debuted in 2009 as the successor of the 300 SL Coupe. SLS AMG production finished at the end of 2014; it was replaced by the AMG GT, with traditional doors and a smaller, twin-turbo V8 engine. Mercedes-Benz 300 SL owners are supported by Gull Wing Group International, which began in 1961. The Wii U game Mario Kart 8 and its Nintendo Switch port, Mario Kart 8 Deluxe, include a 300 SL roadster.

A red 300SL was featured in the 2022 film Uncharted, owned by villain Santiago Moncada (Antonio Banderas). The car ended up being driven out of an airplane into the ocean.

References

Notes

Bibliography

External links 

300 SL
Rear-wheel-drive vehicles
Sports racing cars
Roadsters
Automobiles with gull-wing doors
Rally cars
24 Hours of Le Mans race cars
Cars introduced in 1954
1960s cars